The 2016 Women's European Volleyball League was the eighth edition of the annual tournament. It was held from 3 June to 3 July 2016. The tournament featured 12 teams.

Azerbaijan won their first title after defeating Slovakia in the final.

Pool Composition

League round
All times are local

Pool A

|}

1st tournament
Venue:  Hala Sportowo - Widowiskowa, Twardogóra

|}

2nd tournament
Venue:  Pallati Sportit Ramazan Njala, Durrës

|}

Pool B

|}

1st tournament
Venue:  Topolica Sport Hall, Bar

|}

2nd tournament
Venue:  Salle Colette-Besson, Rennes

|}

Pool C

|}

1st tournament
Venue:  Bujtosi Szabadidő Csarnok, Nyíregyháza

|}

2nd tournament
Venue:  Indoor Sports Hall, Megalopolis

|}

Final four
The top team of each pool will qualify for the final four. Pre-qualified tournament host team will complete the group.

Bracket
All times are local

Semifinal
Leg 1

|}
Leg 2

|}

Final

|}

Final standings

Awards
MVP:  Polina Rahimova

See also
2016 Men's European Volleyball League

References

External links
Official website

External links

2016
European Volleyball League